Crossrail Benelux (VKM: XRAIL) is a Belgian rail freight company, and a subsidiary of BLS Cargo, which operates in Belgium.

History
The company was formed in 2000 as Dillen & Le Jeune Cargo (DLC) and was the first private company to haul a freight train in Belgium. On that moment, both founders owned 50% of the shares. In October 2001, Hupac entered the capital of DLC before the first train was effectively hauled

In April 2002, the first container train was hauled for MSC from Port of Antwerp to Aachen West station by a Class 66 locomotive (leased from Porterbrook), and further to Schwandorf station with another Hupac-hired electric locomotive, breaking the monopoly of state owned NMBS/SNCB (although Belgian freight rail transport was officially opened to private operators only in March 2003, DLC operates based on European directives from 1991 and a security license for the Belgian rail network).

A security license to access the Dutch network was obtained at the beginning of 2003, with the first train hauled to Waalhaven on January 11. Trains to and from the Zeelandic Flanders (a part of Netherlands which is not directly connected to the remainder of the Dutch rail network) became recurring traffic, with the Terneuzen based Bertschi container terminal as client.

In October 2007, DLC merged with Swiss Babcock & Brown owned Crossrail AG. Hupac had left the capital of DLC, so the shareholding structure was dispatched between both DLC founders (having 25.5% each) and Babcock & Brown for the remainder. The merged company operates as Crossrail AG, with subsidiaries in Belgium and Italy. In September 2008, the company acquired a security license to train its own drivers.

Problems between both founders resulted in August 2008 in Jeroen Le Jeune leaving the company for a few months. As Babcock & Brown was facing strong difficulties after the global credit crunch, Jeroen Le Jeune came back and bought their 49% shares in August 2009, together with the shares from Ronny Dillen.

In September 2009, Crossrail successfully sued Belgian rail network manager Infrabel for having given full priority to passenger traffic instead of treating all rail operators equally during a strike.

As traffic grew, Le Jeune quickly faced liquidity problems and searched partners to refund the company: The first candidate was no newcomer. Hupac took a 25% participation on 24 August 2010. As of February 2012, two customers of the company — Austria based LKW Walter and Général Transport Service (GTS) from Italy — acquired respectively 25% and 10% of the shares, with Le Jeune group reducing to 40%. Two other customers — Bertschi AG and MSC — each took 10% of shares from Le Jeune in July 2012.

In April 2016, control of the company has transferred into the hands of Rhenus Group (75%) and LKW Walter (25%). The Swiss division was split off, sold and merged to Cargologic in 2018.

In March 2019, BLS Cargo acquired Crossrail Benelux with effective date January 1st, 2019,  and in 2020 Crossrail Benelux became a full division of the BLS Cargo group, providing traction services in Germany and Belgium exclusively for BLS Cargo, and the customer contracts were transferred to BLS Cargo. Its services for MSC have since been taken over by MSC subsidiary Medway.

References and notes

Notes

References

External links
Official website

Railway companies of Belgium
Railway companies established in 2000